California Assembly Bill 197 (AB 197) AB-197 is a California bill signed into law on September 8, 2016.  It increases legislative oversight of the California Air Resources Board (CARB) and is intended to ensure CARB must report to the Legislature.

AB-197 is directly related to SB-32 in that AB-197 contains language stating AB-197 is only operative if SB-32 is enacted and becomes law on or before January 1, 2017.

The provisions of AB-197 are intended to provide more legislative oversight of CARB by adding two new legislatively appointed non-voting members to the CARB Board, increasing the Legislature's role in the ARB Board's decisions. Additionally, AB-197 limits the term length of CARB Board members to six years. AB-197 also requires that CARB "protect the state's most impacted and disadvantaged communities … [and] consider the social costs of the emissions of greenhouse gases" in preparing plans to meet GHG reduction goals.

AB-197 requires a committee to be formed and called the Joint Legislative Committee on Climate Change Policies (JLCCCP), which will be responsible, among other duties, for addressing and prioritizing the disadvantaged communities in California.

Additionally, as part of AB-197, reports of emissions inventories for GHGs, criteria pollutants, and toxic air contaminants are required to be made public and updated at least once a year.

References

2016 in the environment
Air pollution in California
Climate of California
Greenhouse gas emissions in the United States
United States state environmental legislation